Michael Sarver (born March 28, 1981) is an American singer who was the tenth place finalist on the eighth season of American Idol.

Early life
Sarver was born in Sulphur, Louisiana, and graduated from Sulphur High School. He has two children, McKenna and Grayson.  He has written over 1100 songs for himself and others since the age of 14, and has also been singing since he was an adolescent. Prior to American Idol, Sarver worked as a roughneck on an oil rig.

American Idol

Overview

Sarver auditioned for the eighth season of American Idol in Phoenix, Arizona.  During the first semi-finals week, he was able to garner enough votes to allow him to continue, beating fellow contestant Anoop Desai for the third spot by just over 20,000 votes.  He was eliminated on March 26, 2009, after the panel of judges were unable to unanimously agree to save him. As Sarver was in the top 10, he was able to perform on the American Idols LIVE! Tour 2009.

Performances/Results

 When Ryan Seacrest announced the results in the particular night, Sarver was in the bottom three, but declared safe second when Alexis Grace was eliminated.

Post-Idol
Sarver signed with Dream Records/Universal Music Group in December 2009. That same month, he joined "Idol" alums Gina Glocksen, David Hernandez and Alexis Grace on the American Stars In Concert Tour. He released a self-titled debut album in July 2010, and three songs - "You Are", "Cinderella Girl", and "Ferris Wheel" - were released as singles. His Myspace page later revealed he signed to Dream Records/Fontana Distribution. He has also become the official spokesperson for Credit Power Educational Foundation, Inc. In June 2010, Sarver launched a web site http://michaelsarver.com. In 2012, Sarver left Dream Records due to the inability of the label to fulfill their contractual obligations.

Discography

Studio albums

Singles

Music videos

Awards and nominations

References

External links
Michael Sarver
Michael Sarver on MySpace
Michael Sarver on Twitter
Michael Sarver on American Idol

1981 births
21st-century American singers
Living people
Singers from Texas
Singers from Louisiana
American Idol participants
American multi-instrumentalists
American country singers
People from Jasper, Texas
21st-century American guitarists
Guitarists from Louisiana
Guitarists from Texas
21st-century American drummers
American male pianists
American male guitarists
Country musicians from Texas
Country musicians from Louisiana
21st-century American pianists
21st-century American male singers